Baxandall is a surname. Notable people with the surname include: 

 Lee Baxandall (1935–2008), American writer, editor and critic, and naturist
 Michael Baxandall (1933–2008), British art historian, academic, and curator
 Peter Baxandall, inventor of the Baxandall tone control circuit
 Rosalyn Baxandall, American historian and feminist